The men's Nanquan / Nangun all-round competition at the 2014 Asian Games in Incheon, South Korea was held on 22 September at the Ganghwa Dolmens Gymnasium.

Schedule
All times are Korea Standard Time (UTC+09:00)

Results

References

External links
Official website

Men's nanquan